The Zambian Closed Chess Championship is the national chess championship of Zambia, organized by the Chess Federation of Zambia. Zambia's only grandmaster Amon Simutowe won the championship in 1996 at the age of 14.

Winners since 1996

References

Chess national championships
Chess in Zambia
Sports competitions in Zambia